Robert Arnold Crawshaw (6 March 1869 – 14 September 1952) was a British water polo player and swimmer. He won a gold medal in water polo at the 1900 Summer Olympics and finished fourth in the 200 m free style swimming.

See also
 Great Britain men's Olympic water polo team records and statistics
 List of Olympic champions in men's water polo
 List of Olympic medalists in water polo (men)

References

External links
 

1869 births
1952 deaths
Sportspeople from Bury, Greater Manchester
English male freestyle swimmers
English Olympic medallists
English male water polo players
Swimmers at the 1900 Summer Olympics
Water polo players at the 1900 Summer Olympics
Olympic gold medallists for Great Britain
Olympic water polo players of Great Britain
Olympic medalists in water polo
Medalists at the 1900 Summer Olympics
British male backstroke swimmers